TPI Polene Public Company Limited is Thailand's Second largest cement manufacturer. It also manufactures petrochemicals, including low-density polyethylene (LDPE) and ethylene-vinyl acetate copolymer (EVA).

The company was founded in 1987.

References

Manufacturing companies based in Bangkok
Cement companies of Thailand
Companies established in 1987
Companies listed on the Stock Exchange of Thailand
1987 establishments in Thailand